One competitor from Sweden was present at the 1896 Summer Olympics.  He competed in athletics and gymnastics, with 5 entries in as many events.  Sweden was one of four nations present that won no medals; Italy, Chile and Bulgaria were the others.

Athletics

The high jump was Sjöberg's most successful event, as he took 4th in it.  He took either 4th or 5th in his heat in the 100 metres, needing 2nd to advance to the final.  In the long jump, he placed somewhere between 5th and 9th, jumping something less than 5.74 metres.  He was again somewhere between 5th and 9th in the discus throw, with a distance less than 25.20 metres.

Track & road events

Field events

Gymnastics

Sjöberg did not place in the vaulting competition.

References
  (Digitally available at )
  (Excerpt available at )
 

Nations at the 1896 Summer Olympics
1896
Olympics